Samuel Israel III (born July 20, 1959) is an American fraudster and former hedge fund manager for the Bayou Hedge Fund Group, which he founded in 1996. In 2008, Israel was sentenced to 20 years in prison and ordered to forfeit $300 million for defrauding his investors.

Early life and education

Born into a Jewish family, Israel attended Hackley School in Tarrytown, New York. He does not have a college degree.

Career
In 1996 Israel founded the Bayou Hedge Fund Group, which raised $450 million from its investors and for which Israel was CEO. Bayou and Israel misappropriated these funds for personal use, running what would later be revealed as a Ponzi scheme. After poor returns in 1998, the firm founded a dummy accounting firm, which they hired to audit themselves in order to keep up appearances to investors.

In 2005, Bayou was indicted. On September 29, the Commodity Futures Trading Commission (CFTC) filed charges against Bayou, Israel, and Bayou CFO Daniel Marino. The next year, the hedge fund filed for Chapter 11 bankruptcy-court protection.

On April 14, 2008, Israel was sentenced to 20 years in prison and ordered to forfeit $300 million after pleading guilty to defrauding investors in his bankrupt firm.

Manhunt and arrest
Sentenced in April 2008 to 20 years in federal prison, Israel failed to report to prison as ordered on June 9, 2008. His 2006 GMC Envoy was found abandoned on the Bear Mountain Bridge on June 10, 2008 with "Suicide is Painless" (the title of the theme song for both the movie and TV series M*A*S*H) written in the dust on the hood. Police suspected that this was an attempt by Israel to fake his own death in order to avoid prison. Israel's girlfriend, Debra Ryan, was arrested later that same month for aiding and abetting his escape, and was released on bail. Under intense questioning, Ryan admitted to helping him escape, and that she and Israel parked an RV loaded with Israel's belongings near Bear Mountain Bridge on the day before his disappearance. The pair were featured on America's Most Wanted.

Israel was eventually tracked down to a campground in Granville, Massachusetts, and surrendered to authorities on July 2, 2008. As a consequence, he was further sentenced on July 15, 2009, to an additional two years in prison while his girlfriend was sentenced to three years' probation. Israel is serving his sentence at Federal Correctional Institution, Butner Low in Butner, North Carolina. In 2019, he applied for early release, citing the First Step Act. This application was denied, and Israel's scheduled release date is May 10, 2026.

A Dateline segment about him aired on September 5, 2008. Israel is the subject of the "Suicide is Painless" episode of American Greed on CNBC, first broadcast on February 3, 2010.

In popular culture
In the 2023 Netflix documentary series "Madoff: The Monster of Wall Street" detailing the rise and fall of Bernie Madoff, the arrest of Israel is depicted as a precursor to the public uncovering of Madoff's multibillion-dollar Ponzi scheme.

See also
Marcus Schrenker, convicted after attempting to stage his own death
Octopus: Sam Israel, the Secret Market, and Wall Street's Wildest Con, by Guy Lawson

References

External links
The U.S. Government Is a Sham. The Federal Reserve Is Running a Secret Bond Market. Global Finance Is Controlled by an “Upperworld” of Rogue Black-Ops Fixers New York, July 1, 2012
The Search for a Missing Trader Goes Global, The New York Times, 14 June 2008
Israel's FBI wanted poster
Israel's U.S. Marshals wanted poster
Fugitive hedge-fund swindler in federal custody, Reuters, 2 July 2008
Hedge-Fund Fugitive in Custody, Time, 2 July 2008
Fund Manager Who Faked His Suicide Surrenders, The New York  Times, 3 July 2008

1996 crimes in the United States
20th-century American Jews
American financial businesspeople
American white-collar criminals
American confidence tricksters
Fugitive financiers
American hedge fund managers
Businesspeople from New Orleans
Pyramid and Ponzi schemes
1959 births
Living people
People who faked their own death
American people convicted of fraud
American businesspeople convicted of crimes
Hackley School alumni
21st-century American Jews